Vovos is a Greek surname. Notable people with the surname include:

Armodios Vovos (born 1964), Greek businessman
Babis Vovos, Greek businessman, father of Armodios

Greek-language surnames